Cheerleader Camp may refer to:

Cheerleader Camp, a 1988 movie starring Betsy Russell.
Cheerleader Camp (2007 film), a television movie starring Kristin Cavallari.
Cheerleading, organized routines to cheer on sports teams.